Siani is an Italian surname. Notable people with the surname include:

Alessandro Siani (born 1975), Italian actor, film director, screenwriter and comedian
Giancarlo Siani (1959–1985), Italian journalist
Giorgio Siani (born 1997), Italian footballer
Mike Siani (born 1950), American football player and coach
Sabrina Siani (born 1963), Italian actress
Sammy Siani (born 2000), American baseball player
Sébastien Siani (born 1986), Cameroonian footballer
Thomas Siani (born 1960), Cameroonian cyclist
Valentino Siani (c. 1595 – 1672), Italian luthier

Italian-language surnames